Tadeusz Lucjan Gronowski (5 October 1894 in Warsaw–20 February 1990 in Warsaw) was a Polish graphic artist, architect who worked as an interior designer, painter, and a book illustrator.

He is considered to be one of the creators of the Polish modern poster. Among his works is the still-used logo of the LOT Polish Airlines, which dates to 1929.

Biography sketch
He graduated from the department of architecture at the Warsaw University of Technology, where he studied during 1917-1925, as well as at the École nationale supérieure des Beaux-Arts in Paris, where he also studied painting. During his studies in Warsaw he belonged to the academic society Welecja. As a graphic artist he worked for such periodicals as Pro arte et studio, Skamander and Życie Literackie. He designed print advertisements for pre-WWII notable companies such as E.Wedel (chocolatier), Orbis Hotels (then a tourist agency) and Herse stores. He is the creator of the still-used logo of LOT Polish Airlines, winning a design contest in 1929. Gronowski took part in preparing the multi-color scheme on the tenements lining the Warsaw Old Town Square, and also worked in the city's theatres as a set designer.

He was a member of the "Rhythm" Polish Artists' Association. His work was part of the painting event in the art competition at the 1932 Summer Olympics.

In 1933 he was one of the co-founders of the Commercial Graphic Artists' Circle. Working at the same time within the Polish Union of Graphic Artists, he co-edited the organization's serial Grafika. He spent many of the years between the world wars in Paris, working as interior designer in charge of decor for prestigious and exclusive shops, including Galeries Lafayette.

Awards
He has received many Polish domestic and international prizes and acts of recognition, including the Grand Prix at the Exposition Internationale des Arts Décoratifs et Industriels Modernes in Paris (1925), and the gold medal for his design of Poland's pavilion at the 1939 New York World's Fair. He is considered to be one of the pioneers of the art of the contemporary Polish poster.

Bibliography
 Irena Kossowska, Polish Art Institute at the Polish Academy of Sciences, March 2002. Tadeusz Lucjan Gronowski, a scholarly retrospective biography lodged in the "Art" (Sztuka) section, www.culture.pl

References

External links
 Posters by Tadeusz Gronowski
 18 Most Important Polish Graphic Designers of the 20th Century

1894 births
1990 deaths
20th-century Polish painters
20th-century Polish male artists
Polish poster artists
Polish illustrators
Polish graphic designers
Polish scenic designers
Warsaw University of Technology alumni
Polish interior designers
Architects from Warsaw
Olympic competitors in art competitions
Polish male painters